Kanazawa (written: 金沢 or 金澤) is a Japanese surname. Notable people with the surname include:

Bunko Kanazawa (born 1979), Japanese actress
Hiromasa Kanazawa (born 1983), Japanese football player
Hiroshi Kanazawa, Japanese animator
Hirokazu Kanazawa (1931–2019), Japanese karate instructor
Jo Kanazawa (born 1976), Japanese football player
Ryo Kanazawa (born 1988), Japanese football player
Satoshi Kanazawa (born 1962), British psychologist
Shimeji Kanazawa (1915–2014), Japanese-American social worker
Shin Kanazawa (born 1983), Japanese football player
Takafumi Kanazawa (born 1981), Japanese football player
Takehito Kanazawa (born 1979), Japanese baseball player
Takeshi Kanazawa (born 1984), Japanese baseball player
Yvonne Kanazawa (born 1974), Japanese athlete 

Japanese-language surnames